Richard Moore (November 13, 1923 – November 13, 2012) was an American radar engineer, Professor Emeritus of Electrical Engineering and Computer Science at the University of Kansas and founder of the Radar Systems and Remote Sensing Laboratory Lab (RSL).

He made significant research contributions to microwave remote sensing of atmosphere, ocean, land, ice, and planetary surfaces; radar systems; and radio wave propagation.

Moore graduated with a B.S. in E.E. from the McKelvey School of Engineering at Washington University in St. Louis in 1943 and from M.I.T. Radar School in 1945. In 1951, he earned his Ph.D. from Cornell University.

The same year Moore joined Sandia Corporation and became Section Supervisor. In 1955 he transferred to the University of New Mexico as Acting Chairman and associate professor, becoming Chairman of the EE Department and Professor the following year. In 1962 Moore became Black & Veatch Professor of Electrical Engineering at the University of Kansas.

The Radar Systems and Remote Sensing Laboratory Lab (RSL) was founded, with Prof. Moore as its director, in 1964. One of its early inventions was the radar radiometer and later the scatterometer. Such an instrument was flown on Skylab as the S-193 RADSCAT.

In 1994 Moore became Distinguished Professor Emeritus.

Moore died on his 89th birthday, November 13, 2012, in Lawrence, KS.

Awards
Australia Prize, for Remote Sensing, 1995
Remote Sensing Award, Italian Center, 1995
Fellow, American Association for the Advancement of Science, 1993
Life Fellow of IEEE (Fellow in 1962)
Member, National Academy of Engineering, 1989
Irvin Youngberg Award in the Applied Sciences, University of Kansas, 1989
Louise E. Byrd Graduate Educator Award, University of Kansas, 1984
IEEE Centennial Medal, 1984
Distinguished Achievement Award, IEEE Geoscience and Remote Sensing Society, 1982
Outstanding Technical Achievement Award, IEEE Council on Oceanic Engineering, 1978
Alumni Achievement Award, School of Engineering and Applied Science, Washington University, 1978

Professional Activities
Vice-chairman, International Commission F (1990-1993), Chairman (1993-1996)

References

External links
 https://cresis.ku.edu/content/news/newsletter/2371

American electrical engineers
Members of the United States National Academy of Engineering
Fellow Members of the IEEE
Fellows of the American Association for the Advancement of Science
McKelvey School of Engineering alumni
Massachusetts Institute of Technology alumni
Cornell University College of Engineering alumni
University of Kansas faculty
IEEE Centennial Medal laureates
Australia Prize recipients
2012 deaths
Sandia National Laboratories people
1923 births